Envy ratio, in finance, is the ratio of the price paid by investors to that paid by the management team for their respective shares of the equity. It is used to consider an opportunity for a management buyout. Managers are often allowed to invest at a lower valuation to make their ownership possible and to create a personal financial incentive for them to approve the buyout and to work diligently towards the success of the investment. The envy ratio is somewhat similar to the concept of financial leverage; managers can increase returns on their investments by using other investors' money.

Basic formula

Source

Example
If private equity investors paid $500M for 80% of a company's equity, and a management team paid $60M for 20%, then ER=(500/80)/(60/20)=2.08x. This means that the investors paid for a share 2.08 times more than did the managers. The ratio demonstrates how generous institutional investors are to a management team—the higher the ratio is, the better is the deal for management. 

As a rule of thumb, management should be expected to invest anywhere from six months to one year’s gross salary to demonstrate commitment and have some personal financial risk. In any transaction, the envy ratio is affected by how keen the investors are to do the deal; the competition they are facing; and economic factors.

See also
Management buy-in
LBO
Takeover
Financial ratio

References

External links
Envy Ratio
Envy ratio in EVCA.com

Financial ratios
Private equity